Léon Savary (Fleurier, 1895 - Boudry, 1968) was a Swiss French-speaking writer and journalist  from Payerne, Vaud.

Biography

Savary was the son of a German russified aristocratic mother from the Baltic region (Von Paucker) and a father who was Protestant pastor from Vaud and was a converted to Roman Catholicism. After studying at the University of Fribourg, he worked from 1921 to 1923 for the Geneva newspaper la tribune de Genève, in Geneva, and correspondent in Bern (1935-1946) and Paris (1946-1956). He was Historian of the city of his own choice Fribourg. He wrote about twenty books, most of them are not published anymore.

With René de Weck and Gonzague de Reynold, he formed the troika of Fribourg writers of the early twentieth century.

He had a great knowledge of the Swiss political system and habits. In Letters with Suzanne (French: Lettres à Suzanne, Lausanne, Switzerland, 1949), he denounced "the occult influence of hitlerism on Swiss people during the second world war, which were not conscious of being under". About Swiss Politic in general, in the same book, covering the Federal Palace, he said, with his alert and sharp pen:
"The Swiss do not desire great men, and in politics, they are afraid to have them. What they like is honesty and average aptitude to manage public affairs like a shop. They mistrust superiority and, let us frankly admit, they are horrified at genius. No geniuses, no saints, even talent is suspect. It is enough to say that a politician who showed signs of surpassing the low water mark would be promptly subject to public discredit"

After coming back from Paris in 1956, he spent the end of his life in the cities of Vevey and Bulle.

Works

 Le secret de Joachim Ascalles, 1923
 Manido chez les genevois,1927.
 Fribourg, Payot, Lausanne, 1929.
 Le Collège Saint-Michel, 1932.
 La chartreuse de La Valsainte, 1937.
 Le fardeau léger, 1938.
 Le cordon d'argent, 1940.
 La fin d'un mensonge, 1940.
 Le troupeau sans berger, 1942.
 En passant, la Tribune de Genève editions, 1942.
 Au seuil de la sacristie, 1942.
 Lettres à Suzanne, 1949.
 Le cendrier d'Erymanthe, 1953.
 Les anges gardiens, 1953.
 Le fonds des ressuscités, mémoirs, first volume, 1956.
 Voulez-vous être conseiller national?, 1958.
 Les balances faussées, mémoirs, second volume, 1966.
 La bibliothèque de Sauvives, 1970.
 L'âme de Genève, Slatkine, Geneva, 1978.
 œuvres maîtresses, five volumes, Slatkine, Geneva, 1978.

Awards

Léon Savary won the Schiller Prize in 1960.

Bibliography 

 Maurice Zermatten: Léon Savary à l’occasion de son soixante-dixième anniversaire. Bienne, 1965. 
 Charles Linsmayer: Literaturszene Schweiz. 157 Kurzportraits von Rousseau bis Gertrud Leutenegger. Unionsverlag, Zürich, 1989,  (P. 212 ss)

References

External links
Library of Congress authorities

 

1895 births
1968 deaths
People from Payerne
Swiss writers in French
University of Fribourg alumni
Converts to Roman Catholicism
Converts to Roman Catholicism from Protestantism
20th-century Swiss journalists